Mary Fanett Wheeler (born December 28, 1938) is an American mathematician. She is known for her work on numerical methods for partial differential equations, including domain decomposition methods.

In 1998, Wheeler was elected a member of the National Academy of Engineering for "the computer simulation of subsurface flow and the underlying mathematical algorithms".

In 2009 she was awarded the Theodore von Kármán Prize by the Society for Industrial and Applied Mathematics (SIAM).

Personal background 
Mary Fanett Wheeler was born on December 28, 1938, in Cuero, Texas. She earned a double major in social sciences and mathematics from the University of Texas in 1960, and a Master's degree in 1963.  She did her masters thesis on the Peaceman-Rachford method, and later went on to do her Ph.D. under Rachford at Rice University in 1971.

Professional background 
Wheeler studies finite element analysis and porous media problems with applications in engineering, oil-field exploitation, and the cleaning up of environmental pollution. Her early work consisted of fundamental contributions to finite element methods and numerical analysis.  She then moved into porous media problems, using her numerical expertise to study problems in the oil industry such as managing oil-field extraction.  She also studies environmental problems such as cleaning up underground reservoirs, spills of toxic waste, and carbon dioxide sequestration.  In addition, Wheeler has worked with the United States Army Corps of Engineers on environmental impact in the Chesapeake Bay, Delaware Bay, and Florida Bay.

On the matter of pure versus applied math, Wheeler has been noted to say "To me it is important to see your work used. I do abstract things as well, and I don't know if I will live to see them applied."

Wheeler worked at the Rice University from 1971 to 1995, with a two-year hiatus at University of Houston from 1988–90.  In 1995 she moved to the University of Texas at Austin where she serves as the director of the Center for Subsurface Modeling at the Institute for Computational Engineering and Sciences. She is a Professional Engineer registered with the State of Texas, 1999.  In 1989, she gave the prestigious Noether Lecture for the Association for Women in Mathematics in Phoenix, Arizona. Her talk was titled "Large Scale Modeling of Problems Arising in Flow in Porous Media".

Awards
 Noether Lecture (1989)
 Theodore von Kármán Prize (2009)
 Humboldt Prize (2011)

Memberships
 Fellow, Society for Industrial and Applied Mathematics
 Society of Petroleum Engineers
 Fellow, International Association for Computational Mechanics
 National Academy of Engineering
 American Academy of Arts and Sciences

References

External links 
 
 

20th-century American mathematicians
21st-century American mathematicians
American women mathematicians
Living people
Rice University alumni
Rice University faculty
University of Texas at Austin faculty
1938 births
PDE theorists
Fellows of the Society for Industrial and Applied Mathematics
Humboldt Research Award recipients
Members of the United States National Academy of Engineering
Fellows of the American Academy of Arts and Sciences
Mathematicians from Texas
People from Cuero, Texas
20th-century women mathematicians
21st-century women mathematicians
21st-century American women